Alan West may refer to:

Alan West (footballer) (born 1951), English midfielder
Alan West, Baron West of Spithead (born 1948), British politician and admiral in the Royal Navy
Alan West, former vocalist of English death metal band Bolt Thrower

See also
Allen West (disambiguation)
Allen West (politician)